Ubiquitin-associated protein 2 is a protein that in humans is encoded by the UBAP2 gene.

Function 

This gene is a novel gene isolated based on its expression in the human adrenal gland. The full-length protein encoded by this gene contains a UBA-domain (ubiquitin associated domain), which is a motif found in several proteins having connections to ubiquitin and the ubiquitination pathway. In addition, the protein contains a region similar to a domain found in members of the atrophin-1 family. The function of this protein has not been determined. Additional alternate splice variants may exist, but their full length nature has not been determined.

References

Further reading